= Kampung Membedai =

Village in Malaysia

Kampung Membedai is a village in Federal Territory of Labuan, Malaysia.
